Boucardicus is a genus of land snails with an operculum, terrestrial gastropod mollusks in the family Cyclophoridae. 

It is endemic to Madagascar, consist 199 species and 5 subspecies. Type species is Boucardicus notabilis (Smith, 1892). Included species are very diverse, some species are medium sized (about 10 mm) with conical shell, some are small (height 1.5-3.5 mm) with cylindrical "pupilloid-like" shell.

Species
Species within the genus Boucardicus include:
 Boucardicus notabilis (type species)
 Boucardicus albocinctus
 Boucardicus antiquus
 Boucardicus carylae
 Boucardicus culminans
 Boucardicus curvifolius
 Boucardicus delicatus
 Boucardicus divei
 Boucardicus esetrae
 Boucardicus fidimananai
 Boucardicus fortistriatus
 Boucardicus goudoti (Fischer-Piette & Bedoucha, 1965)
 Boucardicus magnilobatus
 Boucardicus mahermanae
 Boucardicus rakotoarisoni
 Boucardicus randalanai
 Boucardicus simplex
 Boucardicus tridentatus
 Boucardicus victorhernandezi
 Boucardicus anjarae
 Boucardicus avo
 Boucardicus hetra
 Boucardicus lalinify
 Boucardicus mahavariana
 Boucardicus matoatoa
 Boucardicus menoi
 Boucardicus peggyae
 Boucardicus pulchellus
 Boucardicus tantelyae
 Boucardicus monchenkoi
 Boucardicus ambindaensis

References

 
Cyclophoridae
Taxonomy articles created by Polbot